Thennakoon Pathiranalage Nilmini (born January 23, 1965 as නිල්මිණි තෙන්නකෝන්) [Sinhala]), popularly as Nilmini Thennakoon, is an actress in Sri Lankan cinema and television. Highly versatile actress particularly active in television, she is a recipient of Best Actress award multiple times in many local award festivals. She is often referred to as the "tear drop" in Sinhala small screen and also Sri Lankan Madhuri Dixit.

Personal life
She was born on 23 January 1965 to Piyadasa Thennakoon and Shriyani Thennakoon  in Moratuwa. She has two siblings, one elder brother (Late Deleepa Thennakoon) and one younger sister. Her father was a businessman. He died when she was 13 year of age. She completed education from Princess of Wales' College.

She was married to popular singer Madhumadhawa Aravinda, and they have one daughter Swetha Mandakini. She met Madhumadhawa Aravinda during the teledrama Pini Bindu in 1992. They got married on May 5 in 1996. They divorced in early 2000s.

She faced a horrible car accident in 2007. She was sustained grievous bodily injuries from the accident and rushed to the Ragama hospital's ICU. The accident occurred at Balummahara on March 14 when she was rushing to Kurunegala from Colombo for a Television filming event. Her car was reduced to matchwood although the chauffeur miraculously escaped with minor injuries.

Career
In 1980s, she started to act in school stage when she was in grade 7 and studied dancing under Mrs. Vajira Chitrasena. Then she attended "Low Country" and Kandyan dancing under a radio artist Mrs. Chitra Kumari Kalubowila at Moratuwa. Under Chithra's guidance, she performed in a ballet Sasara staged in Rupavahini.

She was introduced into the cinema by popular director Roy de Silva and actress Sumana Amarasinghe. She played in the film Hitha Honda Chandiya in a dancing scene with Bandu Samarasinghe. At the same time, D. B. Nihalsinghe used Thennakoon for his TV Commercials and then for the role "Amaravathi" in the play Dimithu Muthu and then in 1991 film Keli Madala. Her major television acting came through Passe Gena Manamali directed by Nalan Mendis. The she acted in famous tele series Doo Daruwo which was telecast many years on the Rupavahini on Sundays at 8.30 p.m. Her character '"Deepthi" in television serial Doo Daruwo was the major success in her career.

Her maiden cinematic experience came through 1985 film Mawubima Naththam Maranaya, directed by Louie Vanderstraeten with a minor role. Her first major role in cinema came through 1990 film Yukthiyata Wada directed by Sunil Soma Peiris. Some of her popular films are Keli Madala, Nagaran and Le Kiri Kandulu.

In 1992, she won the Sarasaviya award for the Best Upcoming actress for her role in Suranimala. She won the Sarasaviya Award for the Best Actress for the role "Veena" in the film Le Kiri Kandulu. Then she won the Most Popular Teledrama Actress Award for a record six years continuously. In 2008 Raigam Tele'es, Tennakoon won the award for the Best Actress for the role "Tikiri Menika" in serials Handewa directed by Sherly P. Delankawala. In 2016, she won the Sumathi award for the Best Actress for the title role in Amma.

She also participated to the reality program Hiru Mega Stars as the leader of group Shakyans. She also hosted the psychology television program Sith Giman Hala telecast by TV Derana. 

She currently has a beauty salon at Nugegoda.

Selected television serials 

 Abhisamaya as Anupama
 Adaraneeya Amma 
 Akwessa
 Amma as Amma (Punna)
 Anduru Sewaneli
 Aswenna
 Blackmail
 Bodima as Nilmini
 Deveni Kamatha as Nirmala
 Diya Ginisilu 
 Diya Sithuvam 
 Diya Suliya as Sarojini Liyanaarachchi 
 Diya Yata Gini
 Doo Daruwo as Deepthi
 Galaboda Hasthiya
 Ganaga Saha Nishshanka as Nadee
 Gimanata Pavana
 Giravi
 Girikula as Dingiri Amma
 Handewa as Tikiri Menika 
 Himagira
 Hima Varusa 
 Hiru Dahasak Yata
 Hiru Sadu Hamuwee
 Hiruta Muwawen
 Indikadolla
 Isi Daasi
 Isuru Pawura 
 Iti Pahan as Some
 Kulavilokanaya as Pabasara Biso
 Kumarayaneni
 Mansala as Devi
 Maya Ranaga as Biula 
 Mayavi 
 Nethranjali as Nethra
 Nidi Kumari
 Nidikumba Mal
 Parami Pooja
 Pas Mal Pethi
 Passe Gena Manamali
 Pata Sarungal
 Pata Veeduru
 Pinketha as Giravi
 Piyabana Ashwaya
 Raena
 Daam
 Ranagala Watta
 Sagaraya Parada
 Sanda Mediyama
 Sanda Pini Wassa as Maya
 Sasara Saranee
 Susima 
 Thuru Kadauru
 Udawediya Mal
 Uththamavi
 Vishwanthari 
 Visirunu Renu 

 Chess
 Ralla weralata Adarei

Filmography

Awards

Sarasaviya Awards

|-
|| 1992 ||| Suranimala || Best Upcoming Actress || 
|-
|| 2003 ||| Le Kiri Kandulu || Best Actress ||

Sumathi Awards

|-
|| 2000 ||| Isidasi || Best Actress || 
|-
|| 1995 ||| Peoples' Vote || Most Popular Actress || 
|-
|| 2015 ||| Girikula || Best Supporting Actress || 
|-
|| 2016 ||| Amma || Best Actress ||

Raigam Tele'es

|-
|| 2009 ||| Hendewa || Best Actress ||

References

External links
 Nilmini talks about divorce
 මට නම් මම හිතූ ආදරය ලැබිලා
 I will leave the country
 මම පොළවේ පය ගහලා ඉන්න ගැහැනියක්‌
 කාලය කෙතරම් සොඳුරු ද

Living people
Sri Lankan film actresses
1965 births